Bible translations into Dzongkha is about the translations of the Bible into Dzongkha and other languages of Bhutan, the independent country at the foot of the Eastern Himalayas.

Dzongkha
Dzongkha is the national language of Bhutan. It is related to the Tibetan language and is written in the Tibetan alphabet.

The Dzongkha Bible, translated from the New King James Version, is now available. It comes in the forms of the combined Old/New Testament book, the New Testament only, and the New Testament with Psalms and Proverbs.

Other languages
In Bhutan, twenty four languages, including Dzongkha mainly in the west, Tshangla in the east, and Nepali in the south, are used. No Tshangla Bible has been published yet.

See also
Religion in Bhutan
Christianity in Bhutan

References

External links
The New Testament Zhongkha Translation (Slideshare.com)

Dzongkha
Bhutanese culture
Dzongkha language